Tamou is a village and "Rural commune" in Niger. The town is capital of its Rural Commune in the Say Department of Tillabéri Region, in the far southwest of the nation.  It is southwest of Niamey, on the right (western) bank of the Niger River, between the departmental capital Say and the border of Burkina Faso.
 Tamou Commune is home to the Tamou Total Reserve, a wildlife reserve which is part of the larger W National Park and Transborder Reserve.  The Tamou Reserve, in which local people also live, is primarily dedicated to the protection of African Elephant populations which migrate through the region.

Notable people
 Diouldé Laya, sociologist

References

Communes of Tillabéri Region